Health Warning (alternative titles: Da Lei Tai, Da Lui Toi, Future Flash Kung Fu, Digital Master) is a 1983 Hong Kong film directed by Kirk Wong. It is a dystopian sci-fi kung fu film set in the future.

Cast and roles
 Eddy Ko - The Master
 Kwok Wai-keung	
 Ray Lui - Gei
 Mak Wai Cheung		
 San Guai
 Elvis Tsui - Tall skinhead fighter
 Wang Lung Wei - Killer
 Yuen Tin Wan		
 Lee Kwan-Young - Boss of Nazis / Killer's last opponent in finale fight scene (uncredited)

Awards
At the 3rd Hong Kong Film Awards, Health Warning was nominated for Best Picture, and Kirk Wong was nominated for Best Director. The film was listed as one of the "Best 100 Chinese Motion Pictures" during the 24th Hong Kong Film Awards.

See also
 Media about lei tai

References

External links
 
 HK cinemagic entry

1983 films
1980s science fiction action films
Martial arts science fiction films
1983 thriller films
Hong Kong science fiction action films
1980s Hong Kong films